Carl Otto Bartning (2 September 1909 – 11 November 1983) was a German film editor. He edited the 1959 film The Bridge.

Selected filmography
 One Hour of Happiness (1931)
 The Adventurer of Tunis (1931)
 A Crafty Youth (1931)
 Under False Flag (1932)
 The Emperor's Waltz (1933)
 Typhoon (1933)
 Peer Gynt (1934)
 A Night of Change (1935)
 Forget Me Not (1935)
 The Night With the Emperor (1936)
 Victoria in Dover (1936)
 Boccaccio (1936)
 Victoria in Dover (1936)
 Fanny Elssler (1937)
 His Best Friend (1937)
 Seven Slaps (1937)
 Gasparone (1937)
 Nanon (1938)
 The Impossible Mister Pitt (1938)
 A Hopeless Case (1939)
 D III 88 (1939)
 The Lost One (1951)
 The Colourful Dream (1952)
 The Dancing Heart (1953)
 The Stronger Woman (1953)
 Consul Strotthoff (1954)
 A Life for Do (1954)
 The Witch (1954)
 Alibi (1955)
 Heaven Is Never Booked Up (1955)
 Before God and Man (1955)
 Stefanie (1958)
 The Bridge (1959)
 Carnival Confession (1960)
 The Miracle of Father Malachia (1961)
 The Door with Seven Locks (1962)
 The Inn on the River (1962)

References

Bibliography 
 Langford, Michelle. Germany: Directory of World Cinema. Intellect Books, 2012.

External links 
 

1909 births
1982 deaths
German film editors
Film people from Berlin